Nusantara is an Indonesian flagship news programme which broadcast on Nusantara TV. The program broadcast for three to four hours each day through Nusantara Pagi (breakfast news), Nusantara Siang (lunchtime news), Nusantara Petang (evening news) and Nusantara Malam (night news).

Nusantara TV has the tagline "Sahabat Kita" (Our Friends).

References

External links 
  Nusantara TV site

Indonesian television news shows
Indonesian-language television shows
2016 Indonesian television series debuts
2010s Indonesian television series
Mass media in Indonesia stubs
Asian television show stubs